Mu  (uppercase Μ, lowercase μ; Ancient Greek  ,  or μυ—both ) is the 12th letter of the Greek alphabet, representing the voiced bilabial nasal . In the system of Greek numerals it has a value of 40. Mu was derived from the Egyptian hieroglyphic symbol for water, which had been simplified by the Phoenicians and named after their word for water, to become 𐤌 (mem). Letters that derive from mu include the Roman M and the Cyrillic М.

Names

Ancient Greek
In Ancient Greek, the name of the letter was written  and pronounced

Modern Greek
In Modern Greek, the letter is spelled  and pronounced . In polytonic orthography, it is written with an acute accent: .

Use as symbol
The lowercase letter mu (μ) is used as a special symbol in many academic fields. Uppercase mu is not used, because it appears identical to Latin  M.

Measurement
the SI prefix micro-, which represents one millionth, or 10−6. Lowercase letter "u" is often substituted for "μ" when the Greek character is not typographically available; for example the unit "microfarad", correctly  "μF", is often rendered as "uF" or "ufarad" in technical documents.
the micron "μ", an old unit now named the micrometre and denoted "μm"

Mathematics

"μ" is conventionally used to denote certain things; however, any Greek letter or other symbol may be used freely as a variable name.

a measure in measure theory
minimalization in computability theory and Recursion theory
the integrating factor in ordinary differential equations
the degree of membership in a fuzzy set
the Möbius function in number theory
the population mean or expected value in probability and statistics
the Ramanujan–Soldner constant

Physics and engineering
In classical physics and engineering:
the coefficient of friction (also used in aviation as braking coefficient (see Braking action))
reduced mass in the two-body problem
Standard gravitational parameter in celestial mechanics
linear density, or mass per unit length, in strings and other one-dimensional objects
permeability in electromagnetism
the magnetic dipole moment of a current-carrying coil
dynamic viscosity in fluid mechanics
the amplification factor or voltage gain of a triode vacuum tube
the electrical mobility of a charged particle
the rotor advance ratio, the ratio of aircraft airspeed to rotor-tip speed in rotorcraft
the pore water pressure in saturated soil

In particle physics:
the elementary particles called the muon and antimuon
the proton-to-electron mass ratio

In thermodynamics:
the chemical potential of a system or component of a system

Computer science 
In evolutionary algorithms:
 μ, population size from which in each generation λ offspring will generate (the terms μ and λ originate from evolution strategy notation)

In type theory:
 Used to introduce a recursive data type.

Chemistry
In chemistry:
the prefix given in IUPAC nomenclature for a bridging ligand

Biology
In biology:
the mutation rate in population genetics
 A class of Immunoglobulin heavy chain that defines IgM type Antibodies

Pharmacology
In pharmacology:
an important opiate receptor

Orbital mechanics
In orbital mechanics:
Standard gravitational parameter of a celestial body, the product of the gravitational constant G and the mass M
planetary discriminant, represents an experimental measure of the actual degree of cleanliness of the orbital zone, a criterion for defining a planet. The value of μ is calculated by dividing the mass of the candidate body by the total mass of the other objects that share its orbital zone.

Music
Mu chord
Electronic musician Mike Paradinas runs the label Planet Mu which utilizes the letter as its logo, and releases music under the pseudonym μ-Ziq, pronounced "music"
Used as the name of the school idol group μ's, pronounced "muse", consisting of nine singing idols in the anime Love Live! School Idol Project
Official fandom name of Kpop group f(x), appearing as either MeU or 'μ'
Hip-hop artist Muonboy has taken inspiration from the particle for his stage name and his first EP named Mu uses the letter as its title.

Cameras
The Olympus Corporation manufactures a series of digital cameras called Olympus μ  (known as Olympus Stylus in North America)

Linguistics
In phonology:

 mora

In syntax:

 μP (mu phrase) can be used as the name for a functional projection.

In Celtic linguistics:

 /μ/ can represent an Old Irish nasalized labial fricative of uncertain articulation, the ancestor of the sound represented by Modern Irish mh.

Character encodings

 Greek Mu / Coptic Mu

 Mathematical Mu

These characters are used only as mathematical symbols. Stylized Greek text should be encoded using the normal Greek letters, with markup and formatting to indicate text style.

Image list for readers with font problems

See also

 Greek letters used in mathematics, science, and engineering
 Fraser alphabet#Consonants

References

Greek letters